Seydi Ali may refer to:

 Seydi Ali Reis (1498–1563), Ottoman admiral
 Trabluslu Ali Pasha (died 1804), Ottoman governor of Egypt, also known as Seydi Ali Pasha
 Seydi Ali Pasha (died 1821), Ottoman Kapudan Pasha (grand admiral)